The Gaillard Center is a concert hall and performance venue in Charleston, South Carolina. It opened in 2015 and replaced the Gaillard Municipal Auditorium. Both buildings were named after John Palmer Gaillard Jr., mayor of Charleston from 1959 to 1975. Constructing the new facility was a central priority of mayor Joe Riley's administration. The opening, planned for early 2015 in time for the city's Spoleto Festival, was delayed by six months due to budgetary overages. Yo-Yo Ma performed at the opening of the center.

The original structure, the Gaillard Municipal Auditorium and Exhibition Hall, opened in July 1968. For over 40 years, it served as Charleston’s star venue for thousands of memorable performances and civic events. When it first opened, the contemporary Gaillard Auditorium was a symbol of ambition for Charleston’s economic prosperity, cultural growth, status, and civic pride.

With its 1,800-seat Rivers Performance Hall and a large multipurpose exhibition facility, the Gaillard became Charleston’s largest performing arts venue. The Gaillard became home to the Charleston Symphony Orchestra in the early 1980s, and with the founding of Spoleto Festival USA in 1977, it helped propel Charleston onto the world stage.

References

Buildings and structures in Charleston, South Carolina